The Rise of Susan is a 1916 American silent film made by the Peerless Film Company and distributed by World Film which starred Clara Kimball Young. Remnants of a print survive in the Library of Congress missing several reels. A fuller version may exist at the George Eastman House.

Cast
Clara Kimball Young - Susan
Jennie Dickerson - Mrs. Joseph Luckett
Warner Oland - Sinclair La Salle
Marguerite Skirvin - Ninon
Eugene O'Brien - Clavering Gordon

References

External links

 
The Rise of Susan; allmovie.com/synopsis

1916 films
American silent feature films
Films based on short fiction
1916 drama films
Silent American drama films
American black-and-white films
Films with screenplays by Frances Marion
World Film Company films
Films directed by Stanner E. V. Taylor
1910s American films
1910s English-language films
English-language drama films